muMATH is a computer algebra system (CAS), which was developed in the late 1970s and early eighties by Albert D. Rich and David Stoutemyer of Soft Warehouse in Honolulu, Hawaii. It was implemented in the muSIMP programming language which was built on top of a LISP dialect called . Platforms supported were CP/M and TRS-DOS (since muMATH-79), Apple II (since muMATH-80) and DOS (in muMATH-83, the last version, which was published by Microsoft).

The Soft Warehouse later developed Derive, another computer algebra system. The company was purchased by Texas Instruments in 1999, and development of Derive ended in 2006.

Literature
 David D. Shochat, A Symbolic Mathematics System, Creative Computing, Oct. 1982, p. 26
 Gregg Williams, The muSIMP/muMATH-79 Symbolic Math system, a Review, BYTE, Nov. 1980, p. 324
 Stuart Edwards, A Computer-Algebra-Based Calculating System, BYTE 12/1983, pp- 481-494 (Describes a calculator application of muSIMP / muMATH doing automatic unit conversion.)

Computer algebra systems
CP/M software
Discontinued software
Lisp (programming language) software